Altamont is a town in Deuel County, South Dakota, United States. The population was 32 at the 2020 census.

History
Altamont was platted in 1880. It was named for the hills surrounding the town site. The name means "high mountain."

Geography

Transportation

Demographics

2010 census
As of the census of 2010, there were 34 people, 14 households, and 7 families residing in the town. The racial makeup of the town was 97.1% White and 2.9% from two or more races.

There were 14 households, of which 35.7% had children under the age of 18 living with them, 42.9% were married couples living together, 7.1% had a female householder with no husband present, and 50.0% were non-families. 50.0% of all households were made up of individuals, and 28.6% had someone living alone who was 65 years of age or older. The average household size was 2.43 and the average family size was 3.71.

The median age in the town was 33.5 years. 35.3% of residents were under the age of 18; 2.9% were between the ages of 18 and 24; 29.4% were from 25 to 44; 14.7% were from 45 to 64; and 17.6% were 65 years of age or older. The gender makeup of the town was 52.9% male and 47.1% female.

2000 census
As of the census of 2000, there were 34 people, 16 households, and 10 families residing in the town. The population density was 26.9 people per square mile (10.4/km2). There were 18 housing units at an average density of 14.2 per square mile (5.5/km2). The racial makeup of the town was 100.00% White.

There were 16 households, out of which 25.0% had children under the age of 18 living with them, 50.0% were married couples living together, 6.3% had a female householder with no husband present, and 37.5% were non-families. 31.3% of all households were made up of individuals, and 12.5% had someone living alone who was 65 years of age or older. The average household size was 2.13 and the average family size was 2.70.

In the town, the population was spread out, with 23.5% under the age of 18, 2.9% from 18 to 24, 41.2% from 25 to 44, 17.6% from 45 to 64, and 14.7% who were 65 years of age or older. The median age was 38 years. For every 100 females, there were 126.7 males. For every 100 females age 18 and over, there were 116.7 males.

The median income for a household in the town was $36,875, and the median income for a family was $67,500. Males had a median income of $43,750 versus $16,875 for females. The per capita income for the town was $16,559. There were no families and 20.5% of the population living below the poverty line, including no under eighteens and 100.0% of those over 64.

References

Towns in Deuel County, South Dakota
Towns in South Dakota